Zombies of Mora Tau (also known as The Dead That Walk) is a 1957 black-and-white zombie horror film directed by Edward L. Cahn and starring Gregg Palmer, Allison Hayes and Autumn Russel. Distributed by Columbia Pictures, it was produced by Sam Katzman. The screenplay was written by George H. Plympton and Bernard Gordon. Zombies of Mora Tau was released on a double bill with another Katzman-produced film, The Man Who Turned to Stone (1957).

Plot
A team of deep sea divers, led by wealthy American tycoon George Harrison (Ashley), attempt to salvage a fortune in diamonds from the wreckage of a ship that had sunk 60 years earlier off the coast of Africa. When the team arrives, they discover that the ship is cursed and the diamonds are protected by the ship's undead crew, now zombies, who are forced to guard the treasure until the diamonds are destroyed or the curse is finally lifted.

Cast
 Gregg Palmer as Jeff Clark
 Allison Hayes as Mona Harrison
 Autumn Russell as Jan Peters
 Joel Ashley as George Harrison
 Morris Ankrum as Dr. Jonathan Eggert 
 Marjorie Eaton as Grandmother Peters 
 Gene Roth as Sam, the chauffeur 
 Leonard P. Geer as Johnny (as Leonard Geer)
 Karl Davis as Zombie 
 William Baskin as Zombie

DVD release
Sony Pictures Home Entertainment released the film on DVD in October 2007 as part of a two-disc, four-film set of Katzman-produced films called Icons of Horror Collection: Sam Katzman. The set contains Zombies of Mora Tau, Creature with the Atom Brain, The Werewolf and The Giant Claw.

Reception
David Maine of PopMatters rated the film 6 out of 10 stars and described it as "pretty entertaining overall, and enlivened immeasurably by Ms. Eaton’s feisty grandma".  TV Guide rated it 2 out of 5 stars and called it "standard horror quality for grade-B films". Writing in The Zombie Movie Encyclopedia, academic critic Peter Dendle said, "This awkward and talentless movie is nonetheless surprisingly prescient in zombie film history, anticipating a number of motifs that would reappear in later decades". Zombiemania: 80 Movies to Die For author Arnold T. Blumberg wrote that the film is "a fun late-night creature feature, but it's prone to boring passages and a low-rent production quality that never allows it to break out of the B-movie mold", adding that the film is "almost single-handedly saved by the Maria Ouspenskaya/Celia Lovsky stylings of actress Marjorie Eaton, who lends the film an impressive conviction as well as a wry approach to her already sharp dialogue".

See also 
 List of zombie films

References

External links 
 
 
Review of film at Variety

1957 films
1957 horror films
1950s English-language films
American zombie films
American black-and-white films
Columbia Pictures films
Films directed by Edward L. Cahn
Films set in Africa
Films set on islands
Films with screenplays by George H. Plympton
1950s American films